Thomas Shinnick was a member of the Wisconsin State Assembly.

Biography
Shinnick was born on April 1, 1833 in County Cork, Ireland. He moved to Watertown, Wisconsin in 1855.

Career
Shinnick was a member of the Assembly in 1867. Other positions he held include Chairman (similar to Mayor) and Clerk of Watertown. He was a Democrat.

References

People from County Cork
Irish emigrants to the United States (before 1923)
Politicians from Watertown, Wisconsin
Democratic Party members of the Wisconsin State Assembly
Mayors of places in Wisconsin
City and town clerks
1833 births
Year of death missing